Smyrna blomfildia, the Blomfild's beauty, is a species of butterfly in the family Nymphalidae.

Subspecies
Smyrna blomfildia blomfildia Fabricius, 1793 (Brazil)
Smyrna blomfildia datis Fruhstorfer, 1908 (Mexico to Panama)

Distribution and habitat
Blomfild's beauty can be found from south Texas and Mexico to Peru through Central America.

Description
The basic color of the wings is red orange in males, brown in females. The upperside of the forewings show a black apex with three white spots. The underside of hindwings has brown and tan wavy markings with a few submarginal spots.

Biology
The larvae are black, with a bright orange head and strong spines along the white sides. They feed on Urticaceae (Urticastrum, Urrera baccifera), while adults feed on rotting fruits. Males of these butterflies are usually seen in large aggregations imbibing mineralized moisture.

References

External links
 Butterflies of America
 Florida Museum of Natural History

Coeini
Nymphalidae of South America
Butterflies described in 1781